San Nazzaro Sesia is a comune (municipality) in the Province of Novara in the Italian region Piedmont, located about  northeast of Turin and about  west of Novara.

San Nazzaro Sesia borders the following municipalities: Albano Vercellese, Biandrate, Casalbeltrame, Casalvolone, Greggio, Oldenico, Recetto, and Villata. It is home to the Abbey of San Nazzaro e Celso, one of the most important Romanesque complexes in Piedmont.

References